Kampung Kuantan is a small village in Kuala Selangor, Selangor, Malaysia. It is located about 7 kilometres (4.34 miles) from Kuala Selangor town. One of the most famous attractions here is Kuala Selangor Fireflies, a rare natural phenomenon.

References

Kuala Selangor District
Nature sites of Selangor
Towns in Selangor